Barisal District, officially spelled Barishal District from April 2018, is a district in south-central Bangladesh, formerly called Bakerganj district, established in 1797. Its headquarters are in the city of Barisal, which is also the headquarters of Barisal Division.

History
Barisal District is a district in southern Bangladesh and is also the headquarter of Barisal Division. Barisal District traces its origins to Bakerganj district which was established in 1797. It was placed in Barisal Division on 1 January 1993.

Education
Notable educational institutions in Barisal include

 Sher-e-Bangla Medical College
 University of Barisal
 Barisal Engineering College
 Barisal Cadet College
 Govt. B M College
 Brajamohan school, Govt. Barisal College
 Govt. Hatem Ali College
 Govt. Woman's College
 Barisal Polytechnic Institute
 Govt. Fazlul Huq College
 Barisal Technical School and College
 A. Karim Ideal College, and Ideal Cadet School & College
 Patuakhali Science and Technology University (Barisal campus)
 Govt. Shere Bangla College
 Govt. Gouronodi University College
 Govt. Fazlul Haque College, Chakhar
 Amrito Lal day College

Demographics

According to the 2011 Bangladesh census, Barisal district had a population was 2,324,310, of which 1,137,210 were males and 1,187,100 females. Rural population was 1,805,294 (77.67%) while the urban population was 519,016 (22.33%). Barisal district had a literacy rate of 61.24% for the population 7 years and above: 61.88% for males and 60.63% for females.

Religion 

Islam is the predominant religion in the district with a large Hindu population. Historically, the Barisal region has seen one of the highest concentration of Hindus since the area had been part of the British Raj, through the rule of East Pakistan and subsequently after the independence of Bangladesh. However since Partition Hindus have been fleeing the district in large numbers. Among the 10 upazilas of the district, the Agailjhara Upazila has the highest percentage share of Hindus at 42 per cent, while the Muladi Upazila has the lowest at just 1.8 per cent, according to the 2011 Bangladesh census.

Overall, minority populations have seen a steep drop in their share of the total population, as well as a fall in their absolute numbers in Barisal district. The trend is similar to other districts in the wider Barisal division.

Subdivisions
Barisal District is divided into the following Upazilas (formerly called Thanas):
 Agailjhara Upazila
 Babuganj Upazila
 Bakerganj Upazila
 Banaripara Upazila
 Barisal Sadar Upazila
 Gournadi Upazila
 Hizla Upazila
 Mehendiganj Upazila
 Muladi Upazila
 Wazirpur Upazila

Notable personalities
 A. K. Fazlul Huq politician, Chief Minister of undivided Bengal & Governor of erstwhile East Pakistan
 Abdul Wahab Khan, 3rd Speaker of the National Assembly of Pakistan
 Abdur Rahman Biswas, politician, President of Bangladesh
 Anil Biswas, music director composer of Bollywood.
 Aroj Ali Matubbor, Philosopher
 Mahanambrata Brahmachari, Hindu saint
 Kanai Chatterjee, Bengali Maoist leader
 Abdul Gaffar Choudhury, journalist, who wrote Amar Bhaier Rokte Rangano to mark the Bengali Language Movement
 Altaf Mahmud, music director & lyrician, who composed Amar Bhaier Rokte Rangano
 Ghatak Pakhi Bhai, Bangladeshi Matchmaker
 Jibanananda Das, Poet of Ruposi Bangla
 Kusumkumari Das, poet and mother of Jibanananda Das
  Aswini Kumar Dutta, Social Worker, Founder of BM College
 Brajamohan Dutta, Bengali philanthropist and social worker
 Hayat Mahmud, feudal lord, military commander and founder of Miah Bari Mosque
 Mohiuddin Jahangir, officer in Sector 7 of the Muktibahini(1971). The highest recognition of bravery in Bangladesh, Bir Sreshtho.
 Sal Khan, founder of Khan Academy
 Shamsuddin Abul Kalam, Bangladeshi novelist
 Sufia Kamal, The Female Romantic poet of Bangladesh
 Mahapran Jogendra Nath Mandal, Dalit leader and first Minister of Law and Labour in Pakistan
 Tofazzal Hossain Manik Miah, founder editor of The Daily Ittefaq
 Hanif Sanket, Television host, writer, producer
 Mosharraf Karim, Famous Bangladeshi Actor From Gaurnadi Upazilla, TV actor
 Mohammad Abdul Jalil, Sector commander in the war of 1971
 Kamrul Islam Rabbi Cricketer
 Yeasin Khan Footballer
 Pran Ranjan Sengupta, Mathematician and Scientist

Notes

References

 
Districts of Bangladesh
Districts of Bangladesh established before 1971